Big Brother 17 is the seventeenth season of the American reality television series Big Brother. The season premiered on June 24, 2015 with a two-night premiere with the following episode airing on June 25, 2015, broadcast on CBS in the United States and Global in Canada. The season ended with a 90-minute season finale on September 23, 2015, following the fall season premiere of Survivor: Cambodia, after 98 days of competition. Julie Chen returned as host. On September 23, 2015, Steve Moses was crowned the winner defeating Liz Nolan in a 6-3 jury vote. James Huling was voted as the season's America's Favorite HouseGuest.

Format
Big Brother follows a group of contestants, known as HouseGuests, who live inside a custom-built house outfitted with cameras and microphones recording their every move 24 hours a day. The HouseGuests are sequestered with no contact with the outside world. During their stay, the HouseGuests share their thoughts on their day-to-day lives inside the house in a private room known as the Diary Room. Each week, the HouseGuests compete in competitions in order to win power and safety inside the house.

At the start of each week, the HouseGuests compete in a Head of Household (abbreviated as "HOH") competition. The winner of the HoH competition is immune from eviction and selects two HouseGuests to be nominated for eviction. As with the previous season, the first five weeks of the season feature two concurrent Heads of Household. Each HoH would nominate two HouseGuests for eviction, for a total of four nominees. The two pairs of nominees would then compete in a "Battle of the Block" competition. The winning pair would be removed from the block, with the HoH who nominated them dethroned. The dethroned HoH would later be eligible to be nominated as a replacement if the Veto is used, while the Battle of the Block winners are safe for the rest of the week.

Six HouseGuests are then selected to compete in the Power of Veto (abbreviated as "PoV") competition: the reigning HoH, the nominees, and three other HouseGuests chosen by random draw. The winner of the PoV competition has the right to either revoke the nomination of one of the nominated HouseGuests or leave them as is. If the veto winner uses this power, the HoH must immediately nominate another HouseGuest for eviction. The PoV winner is also immune from being named as the replacement nominee. The HouseGuest overthrown as a result of the Battle of the Block competition is eligible to be nominated by the reigning Head of Household if the Power of Veto is used.

On eviction night, all HouseGuests vote to evict one of the nominees, though the Head of Household and the nominees are not allowed to vote. This vote is conducted in the privacy of the Diary Room. In the event of a tie, the Head of Household casts the tie-breaking vote. The nominee with the most votes is evicted from the house. The last nine evicted HouseGuests comprise the Jury and are sequestered in a separate location following their eviction and ultimately decide the winner of the season. The Jury is only allowed to see the competitions and ceremonies that include all of the remaining HouseGuests; they are not shown any interviews or other footage that might include strategy or details regarding nominations. All evicted HouseGuests are eligible to win this award except for those who either voluntarily leave or are forcibly removed.

HouseGuests

On June 16, 2015, 14 HouseGuests were announced by CBS, including Audrey Middleton, the first transgender contestant to appear on the American version of Big Brother, professional wrestler and former WWE NXT competitor Austin Matelson and Vanessa Rousso, who, when the season began, was ranked among the top five women in poker history in terms of all-time money winnings. On June 25, 2015, The Amazing Race 26 alumni Jackie Ibarra and Jeff Weldon were revealed as the 15th and 16th HouseGuests as part of the first Takeover. It was later revealed that HouseGuest Liz Nolan and her twin sister, Julia, were competing as one for the Twin Twist; after surviving the first five evictions, the twins began competing separately, increasing the total number of HouseGuests to 17, the most ever in an American season of Big Brother.

Future appearances
In the Big Brother version of The Price is Right, James Huling and Da'Vonne Rogers were both selected as competitors of the show. James and Da'Vonne both returned as HouseGuests on Big Brother 18. Jason Roy was a HouseGuest on Big Brother: Over the Top, while Liz Nolan made an appearance for a Halloween event. In 2020, Da'Vonne returned for a third time to compete on Big Brother: All-Stars.

Outside Big Brother, Da'Vonne Rogers also competed on MTV's The Challenge: Final Reckoning, where she was paired with Big Brother 18 castmate Jozea Flores. Da'Vonne Rogers, Liz Nolan, and Julia Nolan all appeared on The Challenge: War of the Worlds. Da'Vonne also appeared on the fifth season of Ex on the Beach.

Episodes

Twists

BB Takeover
CBS announced the season's twist, BB Takeover, on June 17, 2015, in which a surprise guest would visit the house each week to reveal a different twist to the HouseGuests. Though it was initially announced that there would be a guest every week, there were no Takeovers after Week 3; in an interview during the season, Julie Chen stated that the twist had been cancelled because "there was enough going on” with the other elements of the game, though no official announcement was ever made to the HouseGuests.

Battle of the Block
The Battle of the block was first introduced in the sixteenth season. In the twist, two houseguests would be nominated by each Head of Household. Each pair of HouseGuests would compete in a Battle of the Block competition. Whichever pair won would have safety for the week, and the Head of Household who nominated them would be dethroned, leaving one Head of Household remaining.

Twin Twist
As with the fifth season, a pair of twins competed as one HouseGuest, switching every few days between the house and a sequestered location off-site. The twins, Liz and Julia, played as Liz, changing places in the Diary Room with approximately ten minutes to catch each other up. After the twins survived the first five evictions, the twist was revealed and both twins competed separately. Though the twist was not officially revealed to the other HouseGuests before its completion, the twins were allowed to discuss it freely.

Voting history

Two Head of Household & Battle of The Block
For the first five weeks, two Heads of Household were named each week. Each HoH named their set of Nominations. The two pairs of nominees then competed in the "Battle of the Block" competition. The winning pair would win Immunity for the week (indicated by ), while the HoH who nominated them would be dethroned (indicated in strikethrough). The dethroned HoH would later be eligible to be nominated after the Power of Veto had been used.

Notes

: This Head of Household was dethroned after their nominees won the "Battle of the Block" competition. 
:  For volunteering to sit out the Week 1 Head of Household competition, Da'Vonne and Vanessa were awarded the BB Fast Forward; they were both immune from nomination for the week and were each instructed to share the Fast Forward with another HouseGuest; they chose Liz and Austin.
:  This player won immunity for winning the "Battle of the Block" competition.
: Identical twins Liz and Julia took turns playing as a single HouseGuest during the first five weeks, secretly trading places every few days between living inside the house and being in sequester. Both twins pretended to be Liz until they completed this task. Following the fifth eviction, if Liz was still in the game, Julia would be allowed to enter the house on her own and both twins would be allowed to play for themselves.
:  Da'Vonne won the "Last Laugh" power, which allowed her to block three HouseGuests from voting in this week's eviction; she chose Becky, Jackie, and Jeff.
: Audrey was given a penalty vote after eating normal food while on the mandatory Have-Not diet.
:  After successfully surviving five evictions, Julia won entry into the game as an individual player.
: This week was a Double Eviction Week. Following the first eviction, the remaining HouseGuests played a week's worth of Big Brother, including HoH and Veto competitions, and nomination, veto and eviction ceremonies, during the live show, culminating in a second eviction for the week.
:  Shelli, Jackie, Becky, and John competed for an opportunity to come back into the game. John won the competition and re-entered the house.
: As the house’s vote was tied, the Head of Household cast the tie-breaker vote.
: As Head of Household, Steve chose to evict Vanessa.
: During the finale, the Jury voted for the winner of Big Brother.

Production
On September 24, 2014, CBS announced that it had renewed Big Brother for its seventeenth and eighteenth editions for broadcast in summer 2015 and 2016, respectively. The series would continue to be hosted by Julie Chen.

On June 15, 2015, CBS released pictures of the house via Entertainment Tonight, which has a modern steel beach house theme. The upstairs is 155 square feet larger than in previous seasons, the result of the incorporation of a glass bridge added in by Big Brother house designer Scott Storey. Season 17 is the first season for which the live feeds were bundled with CBS All Access, an over-the-top streaming service launched by CBS in January 2015 that allows users to view past and present episodes of CBS shows, and includes the live feeds and special Big Brother content.

While the aired episodes had transitioned to HD the previous season, BB17 was the first season in which the live internet feeds were broadcast in HD.

Reception

Viewing figures

References

External links
  – official American site
  – official Canadian site
 

2015 American television seasons
17